Slobodka is the name of several rural localities in Russia.

Modern localities

Arkhangelsk Oblast
As of 2012, three rural localities in Arkhangelsk Oblast bear this name:
Slobodka, Kholmogorsky District, Arkhangelsk Oblast, a village in Yemetsky Selsoviet of Kholmogorsky District
Slobodka, Primorsky District, Arkhangelsk Oblast, a village in Lisestrovsky Selsoviet of Primorsky District
Slobodka, Vilegodsky District, Arkhangelsk Oblast, a village in Vilegodsky Selsoviet of Vilegodsky District

Republic of Bashkortostan
As of 2012, one rural locality in the Republic of Bashkortostan bears this name:
Slobodka, Republic of Bashkortostan, a khutor in Skvorchikhinsky Selsoviet of Ishimbaysky District

Bryansk Oblast
As of 2012, one rural locality in Bryansk Oblast bears this name:
Slobodka, Bryansk Oblast, a village in Lopandinsky Rural Administrative Okrug of Komarichsky District;

Ivanovo Oblast
As of 2012, three rural localities in Ivanovo Oblast bear this name:
Slobodka, Komsomolsky District, Ivanovo Oblast, a village in Komsomolsky District
Slobodka, Rodnikovsky District, Ivanovo Oblast, a village in Rodnikovsky District
Slobodka, Shuysky District, Ivanovo Oblast, a village in Shuysky District

Kaluga Oblast
As of 2012, seven rural localities in Kaluga Oblast bear this name:
Slobodka, Babyninsky District, Kaluga Oblast, a village in Babyninsky District
Slobodka, Duminichsky District, Kaluga Oblast, a village in Duminichsky District
Slobodka, Lyudinovsky District, Kaluga Oblast, a village in Lyudinovsky District
Slobodka, Meshchovsky District, Kaluga Oblast, a village in Meshchovsky District
Slobodka, Spas-Demensky District, Kaluga Oblast, a village in Spas-Demensky District
Slobodka, Tarussky District, Kaluga Oblast, a village in Tarussky District
Slobodka, Ulyanovsky District, Kaluga Oblast, a village in Ulyanovsky District

Kirov Oblast
As of 2012, three rural localities in Kirov Oblast bear this name:
Slobodka, Orlovsky District, Kirov Oblast, a village in Podgorodny Rural Okrug of Orlovsky District
Slobodka, Denisovsky Rural Okrug, Slobodskoy District, Kirov Oblast, a village in Denisovsky Rural Okrug of Slobodskoy District
Slobodka, Ilyinsky Rural Okrug, Slobodskoy District, Kirov Oblast, a village in Ilyinsky Rural Okrug of Slobodskoy District

Kostroma Oblast
As of 2012, three rural localities in Kostroma Oblast bear this name:
Slobodka, Buysky District, Kostroma Oblast, a village in Tsentralnoye Settlement of Buysky District
Slobodka, Kostromskoy District, Kostroma Oblast, a village in Baksheyevskoye Settlement of Kostromskoy District
Slobodka, Sudislavsky District, Kostroma Oblast, a village in Raslovskoye Settlement of Sudislavsky District

Krasnodar Krai
As of 2012, one rural locality in Krasnodar Krai bears this name:
Slobodka, Krasnodar Krai, a khutor in Achuyevsky Rural Okrug of Slavyansky District

Kursk Oblast
As of 2012, two rural localities in Kursk Oblast bear this name:
Slobodka, Rylsky District, Kursk Oblast, a village in Nekrasovsky Selsoviet of Rylsky District
Slobodka, Zolotukhinsky District, Kursk Oblast, a village in Vereitinovsky Selsoviet of Zolotukhinsky District

Leningrad Oblast
As of 2012, two rural localities in Leningrad Oblast bear this name:
Slobodka, Kingiseppsky District, Leningrad Oblast, a village in Vistinskoye Settlement Municipal Formation of Kingiseppsky District
Slobodka, Volosovsky District, Leningrad Oblast, a village in Seltsovskoye Settlement Municipal Formation of Volosovsky District

Lipetsk Oblast
As of 2012, five rural localities in Lipetsk Oblast bear this name:
Slobodka, Dankovsky District, Lipetsk Oblast, a village in Voskresensky Selsoviet of Dankovsky District
Slobodka, Lebedyansky District, Lipetsk Oblast, a selo in Slobodskoy Selsoviet of Lebedyansky District
Slobodka, Lipetsky District, Lipetsk Oblast, a village in Ivovsky Selsoviet of Lipetsky District
Slobodka, Stanovlyansky District, Lipetsk Oblast, a village in Solovyevsky Selsoviet of Stanovlyansky District
Slobodka, Yeletsky District, Lipetsk Oblast, a village in Volchansky Selsoviet of Yeletsky District

Moscow Oblast
As of 2012, four rural localities in Moscow Oblast bear this name:
Slobodka, Klinsky District, Moscow Oblast, a village in Voroninskoye Rural Settlement of Klinsky District
Slobodka, Nikonovskoye Rural Settlement, Ramensky District, Moscow Oblast, a village in Nikonovskoye Rural Settlement of Ramensky District
Slobodka, Rybolovskoye Rural Settlement, Ramensky District, Moscow Oblast, a village in Rybolovskoye Rural Settlement of Ramensky District
Slobodka, Sergiyevo-Posadsky District, Moscow Oblast, a village in Bereznyakovskoye Rural Settlement of Sergiyevo-Posadsky District

Novgorod Oblast
As of 2012, one rural locality in Novgorod Oblast bears this name:
Slobodka, Novgorod Oblast, a village in Fedorkovskoye Settlement of Parfinsky District

Omsk Oblast
As of 2012, one rural locality in Omsk Oblast bears this name:
Slobodka, Omsk Oblast, a village in Solovetsky Rural Okrug of Nizhneomsky District

Orenburg Oblast
As of 2012, one rural locality in Orenburg Oblast bears this name:
Slobodka, Orenburg Oblast, a settlement in Rodinsky Selsoviet of Sorochinsky District

Oryol Oblast
As of 2012, eleven rural localities in Oryol Oblast bear this name:
Slobodka, Bolkhovsky District, Oryol Oblast, a settlement in Mikhnevsky Selsoviet of Bolkhovsky District
Slobodka, Dolzhansky District, Oryol Oblast, a village in Dubrovsky Selsoviet of Dolzhansky District
Slobodka, Telchensky Selsoviet, Mtsensky District, Oryol Oblast, a village in Telchensky Selsoviet of Mtsensky District
Slobodka, Voinsky Selsoviet, Mtsensky District, Oryol Oblast, a village in Voinsky Selsoviet of Mtsensky District
Slobodka, Orlovsky District, Oryol Oblast, a village in Troitsky Selsoviet of Orlovsky District
Slobodka, Pokrovsky District, Oryol Oblast, a village in Topkovsky Selsoviet of Pokrovsky District
Slobodka, Shablykinsky District, Oryol Oblast, a village in Somovsky Selsoviet of Shablykinsky District
Slobodka, Trosnyansky District, Oryol Oblast, a village in Pennovsky Selsoviet of Trosnyansky District
Slobodka, Uritsky District, Oryol Oblast, a village in Bogdanovsky Selsoviet of Uritsky District
Slobodka, Glotovsky Selsoviet, Znamensky District, Oryol Oblast, a village in Glotovsky Selsoviet of Znamensky District
Slobodka, Koptevsky Selsoviet, Znamensky District, Oryol Oblast, a settlement in Koptevsky Selsoviet of Znamensky District

Perm Krai
As of 2012, one rural locality in Perm Krai bear this name:
Slobodka, Ilyinsky District, Perm Krai, a village in Ilyinsky District

Pskov Oblast
As of 2012, two rural localities in Pskov Oblast bear this name:
Slobodka, Loknyansky District, Pskov Oblast, a village in Loknyansky District
Slobodka, Novosokolnichesky District, Pskov Oblast, a village in Novosokolnichesky District

Ryazan Oblast
As of 2012, three rural localities in Ryazan Oblast bear this name:
Slobodka, Korablinsky District, Ryazan Oblast, a village in Neznanovsky Rural Okrug of Korablinsky District
Slobodka, Mikhaylovsky District, Ryazan Oblast, a village in Slobodskoy Rural Okrug of Mikhaylovsky District
Slobodka, Ryazansky District, Ryazan Oblast, a village in Vyshetravinsky Rural Okrug of Ryazansky District

Smolensk Oblast
As of 2012, two rural localities in Smolensk Oblast bear this name:
Slobodka, Glinkovsky District, Smolensk Oblast, a village in Romodanovskoye Rural Settlement of Glinkovsky District
Slobodka, Ugransky District, Smolensk Oblast, a village in Slobodskoye Rural Settlement of Ugransky District

Tula Oblast
As of 2012, nine rural localities in Tula Oblast bear this name:
Slobodka, Michurinsky Rural Okrug, Aleksinsky District, Tula Oblast, a village in Michurinsky Rural Okrug of Aleksinsky District
Slobodka, Sukhodolsky Rural Okrug, Aleksinsky District, Tula Oblast, a village in Sukhodolsky Rural Okrug of Aleksinsky District
Slobodka, Belyovsky District, Tula Oblast, a village in Bogdanovsky Rural Okrug of Belyovsky District
Slobodka, Chernsky District, Tula Oblast, a village in Velyenikolskaya Rural Administration of Chernsky District
Slobodka, Kuznetsovsky Rural Okrug, Kireyevsky District, Tula Oblast, a village in Kuznetsovsky Rural Okrug of Kireyevsky District
Slobodka, Novoselsky Rural Okrug, Kireyevsky District, Tula Oblast, a village in Novoselsky Rural Okrug of Kireyevsky District
Slobodka, Leninsky District, Tula Oblast, a selo in Oktyabrsky Rural Okrug of Leninsky District
Slobodka, Berezovskaya Rural Administration, Odoyevsky District, Tula Oblast, a village in Berezovskaya Rural Administration of Odoyevsky District
Slobodka, Zhemchuzhnikovskaya Rural Administration, Odoyevsky District, Tula Oblast, a village in Zhemchuzhnikovskaya Rural Administration of Odoyevsky District

Tver Oblast
As of 2012, seven rural localities in Tver Oblast bear this name:
Slobodka, Burashevskoye Rural Settlement, Kalininsky District, Tver Oblast, a village in Burashevskoye Rural Settlement of Kalininsky District
Slobodka, Mednovskoye Rural Settlement, Kalininsky District, Tver Oblast, a village in Mednovskoye Rural Settlement of Kalininsky District
Slobodka, Verkhnevolzhskoye Rural Settlement, Kalininsky District, Tver Oblast, a village in Verkhnevolzhskoye Rural Settlement of Kalininsky District
Slobodka, Barykovskoye Rural Settlement, Kashinsky District, Tver Oblast, a village in Barykovskoye Rural Settlement of Kashinsky District
Slobodka, Verkhnetroitskoye Rural Settlement, Kashinsky District, Tver Oblast, a village in Verkhnetroitskoye Rural Settlement of Kashinsky District
Slobodka, Kimrsky District, Tver Oblast, a village in Tsentralnoye Rural Settlement of Kimrsky District
Slobodka, Konakovsky District, Tver Oblast, a village in Ruchyevskoye Rural Settlement of Konakovsky District

Vladimir Oblast
As of 2012, two rural localities in Vladimir Oblast bear this name:
Slobodka, Kirzhachsky District, Vladimir Oblast, a village in Kirzhachsky District
Slobodka, Vyaznikovsky District, Vladimir Oblast, a village in Vyaznikovsky District

Vologda Oblast
As of 2012, ten rural localities in Vologda Oblast bear this name:
Slobodka, Kharovsky District, Vologda Oblast, a village in Shevnitsky Selsoviet of Kharovsky District
Slobodka, Kichmengsko-Gorodetsky District, Vologda Oblast, a selo in Nizhneyenangsky Selsoviet of Kichmengsko-Gorodetsky District
Slobodka, Mezhdurechensky District, Vologda Oblast, a village in Turovetsky Selsoviet of Mezhdurechensky District
Slobodka, Nyuksensky District, Vologda Oblast, a village in Gorodishchensky Selsoviet of Nyuksensky District
Slobodka, Rezhsky Selsoviet, Syamzhensky District, Vologda Oblast, a village in Rezhsky Selsoviet of Syamzhensky District
Slobodka, Ustretsky Selsoviet, Syamzhensky District, Vologda Oblast, a village in Ustretsky Selsoviet of Syamzhensky District
Slobodka, Zhityevsky Selsoviet, Syamzhensky District, Vologda Oblast, a village in Zhityevsky Selsoviet of Syamzhensky District
Slobodka, Tarnogsky District, Vologda Oblast, a village in Markushevsky Selsoviet of Tarnogsky District
Slobodka, Parfenovsky Selsoviet, Velikoustyugsky District, Vologda Oblast, a village in Parfenovsky Selsoviet of Velikoustyugsky District
Slobodka, Yudinsky Selsoviet, Velikoustyugsky District, Vologda Oblast, a village in Yudinsky Selsoviet of Velikoustyugsky District

Yaroslavl Oblast
As of 2012, four rural localities in Yaroslavl Oblast bear this name:
Slobodka, Bolsheselsky District, Yaroslavl Oblast, a village in Blagoveshchensky Rural Okrug of Bolsheselsky District
Slobodka, Lyubimsky District, Yaroslavl Oblast, a village in Voskresensky Rural Okrug of Lyubimsky District
Slobodka, Pereslavsky District, Yaroslavl Oblast, a village in Perelessky Rural Okrug of Pereslavsky District
Slobodka, Yaroslavsky District, Yaroslavl Oblast, a village in Kurbsky Rural Okrug of Yaroslavsky District

Abolished localities
Slobodka, Beryozovsky District, Perm Krai, a village in Beryozovsky District of Perm Krai; abolished in December 2011

Alternative names
Slobodka, alternative name of Sloboda, a village under the administrative jurisdiction of Karachev Urban Administrative Okrug in Karachevsky District of Bryansk Oblast;

See also
Sloboda (disambiguation)
Slobodskoy (disambiguation)